Zieleniewo may refer to the following places:
Zieleniewo, Kuyavian-Pomeranian Voivodeship (north-central Poland)
Zieleniewo, Choszczno County in West Pomeranian Voivodeship (north-west Poland)
Zieleniewo, Kołobrzeg County in West Pomeranian Voivodeship (north-west Poland)
Zieleniewo, Koszalin County in West Pomeranian Voivodeship (north-west Poland)
Zieleniewo, Stargard County in West Pomeranian Voivodeship (north-west Poland)